Roger Loyer (5 August 1907 – 24 March 1988) was a motorcycle road racer and racing driver from France.  He won the 1937 250cc French motorcycle Grand Prix and the 1938 350cc French motorcycle Grand Prix.

He participated in one Formula One World Championship Grand Prix, the Argentine Grand Prix on 17 January 1954.  His Gordini Type 16 ran out of oil, and he scored no championship points.  Shortly after, this car failed again during the non-Championship Buenos Aires Grand Prix, but Loyer was able to share Élie Bayol's car to finish 10th.

Complete Formula One World Championship results
(key) 

French racing drivers
French Formula One drivers
Gordini Formula One drivers
French motorcycle racers
24 Hours of Le Mans drivers
1907 births
1988 deaths
World Sportscar Championship drivers